Arthur Delevan Gilman (November 5, 1821, Newburyport, Massachusetts – July 11, 1882, Syracuse, New York) was an American architect, designer of many Boston neighborhoods, and member of the American Institute of Architects.

Life and career
Gilman was a descendant of Edward Gilman, Sr., one of the first settlers of Exeter, New Hampshire. Gilman was educated at Trinity College in Hartford, Connecticut. In 1844 he published a paper on "American Architecture" in the North American Review, which was translated into several foreign languages. He was then invited to deliver twelve lectures before the Lowell Institute, Boston, after which he went to Europe on a tour of professional observation.

On his return to Boston, he advocated filling in the Back Bay district, urging this plan for years before his views were carried out by the state. Here Gridley James Fox Bryant was his colleague. Commonwealth Avenue, now one of the finest streets in the world, is due almost entirely to his persistent efforts, along with Frederick Law Olmsted. Gilman designed the H. H. Hunnewell house (1851) in Wellesley (then West Needham) and, with Bryant, the Old City Hall in Boston (1862–65).

In 1865 he moved to New York City, where he designed the original Equitable Insurance Company's building, the Bennett Building for The New York Herald, and St. John's Church and parsonage circa 1869 in Clifton, Staten Island.

Works
In addition to the projects mentioned above, he also designed:
 St. Paul's Church (1858), Dedham, Massachusetts 
 Christ Church (1860), Brookline, Massachusetts 
 Horticultural Hall (1865), Tremont St., Boston, Massachusetts, with Bryant

References
Notes

Sources

External links

 Benjamin J. Stark residence (New London, Conn.) : architectural drawings, 1866. Held by the Department of Drawings & Archives, Avery Architectural & Fine Arts Library, Columbia University.

1821 births
1882 deaths
Gilman family of New Hampshire
Architects from Boston
19th-century American architects